Events in the year 2012 in Belarus.

Incumbents 

 President: Alexander Lukashenko
 Prime Minister: Mikhail Myasnikovich

Events

Deaths 

 2 May – Zvi Zeitlin, classical violinist (b. 1922).

See also 

 List of years in Belarus
 2012 in Belarus

References

External links 

 

 
Years of the 21st century in Belarus
2010s in Belarus
Belarus
Belarus